Enda Wyley is an Irish writer of poetry and children's literature.

Life
Enda Wyley was born in Dún Laoghaire, County Dublin in 1966 and lives in Dublin.

She was awarded a B.Ed. by the Marino Institute of Education, Dublin and then worked for twenty years as a primary school teacher.

She obtained an M.A in creative writing from Lancaster University.

She is married to Peter Sirr who is also a poet and they have one daughter.

Work
She writes poetry and children's literature.

She has been the Poet-at-Work in the Coombe Maternity Hospital, Dublin and Writer in Residence at the Marino Institute.

Works

Poetry
 Eating Baby Jesus (Dedalus Press, 1993)
 Socrates in the Garden (Dedalus Press, 1998)
 Poems for Breakfast (Dedalus Press, 2004)
 To Wake to This (Dedalus Press, 2009)
 Borrowed Space, New and Selected Poems (Dedalus Press, 2014)
 The Painter on his Bike (Dedalus Press, 2019).

Children's literature
 Boo and Bear (O'Brien Press, 2003)
 The Silver Notebook (O'Brien Press, 2007) 
 I Won’t Go to China! (O'Brien Press, 2009)

Awards
 2015 - Member, Aosdána - 
 2013 - Patrick and Katherine Kavanagh Fellowship for her poetry
 2011 - Reading Association of Ireland Special Merit Award
 1996 - Vincent Buckley Poetry Prize

See also
 List of Irish writers

References

Aosdána members
20th-century Irish writers
21st-century Irish writers
Irish poets
1966 births
Living people
Irish writers
Alumni of Marino Institute of Education